Reece Jones (born 1976) is an American political geographer and Guggenheim Fellow. Jones was educated at the University of North Carolina at Chapel Hill and the University of Wisconsin at Madison.

Life and career 
Jones is currently a professor of geography and environment at the University of Hawai'i at Manoa. He was the president of the Political Geography Specialty Group of the American Association of Geographers from 2014–15. He is the editor-in-chief at the journal Geopolitics.  He is also the co-editor of the Routledge Geopolitics Book Series with Klaus Dodds. He was named a Fellow of the American Association of Geographers in 2023.

Violent Borders 
Jones is best known for his work on border walls, the militarization of borders, and the rise in migrant deaths. His book Violent Borders: Refugees and the Right to Move argues that making and enforcing a border is an inherently violent act. The citation for the PolGRG Book Award from the Royal Geographical Society called Violent Borders one of the most "influential political geography books published in recent times." Jones writes for a popular audience through opinion pieces arguing against border walls in The New York Times and for open borders in The Guardian.

Selected publications 

 Nobody is Protected: How the Border Patrol Became the Most Dangerous Police Force in the United States (2022, Counterpoint Press) 
 White Borders: The History of Race and Immigration in the United States from Chinese Exclusion to the Border Wall (2021, Beacon Press) 
 Open Borders: In Defense of Free Movement (2019, University of Georgia Press) 
 Borders and Mobility in South Asia and Beyond (2018, Amsterdam University Press) Co-edited with Md. Azmeary Ferdoush 
 Violent Borders: Refugees and the Right to Move (2016, Verso) 
 Placing the Border in Everyday Life (2014, Routledge) Co-edited with Corey Johnson 
 Border Walls: Security and the War on Terror in the United States, India, and Israel (2012, Zed)

Honors and awards 

 2023 Fellow of the American Association of Geographers
 2021 Guggenheim Fellowship
 2018 PolGRG Book Award from the Royal Geographical Society for Violent Borders
 2017 Julian Minghi Distinguished Book Award from the American Association of Geographers for Violent Borders
 2016 Past Presidents' Gold Book Award from the Association of Borderlands Studies for Placing the Border in Everyday Life 
 2013 Julian Minghi Distinguished Book Award from the American Association of Geographers for Border Walls 
 2012 University of Hawai'i Regents Medal for Excellence in Teaching

References 

American geographers
Political geographers
1976 births
Living people
University of Wisconsin–Madison alumni
University of Hawaiʻi faculty
University of North Carolina at Chapel Hill alumni